Mantatao is an island off the coast of Bohol, Philippines. Mantatao is one of multiple chains of islands located in the Danajon Bank, the only double barrier reef in the country. The island is one of the 33 barangays that comprise the municipality of Calape. As of 2020, Mantatao's population is 972.

It is known for having an abundance of fish, squid, shell/clams and seaweeds. Mantatao Island is surrounded by mangrove forest, which is the natural habitat for marine creatures. It has an elementary school  and a diesel power plant, which is operated by the National Power Corporation.

Recently, the island has experienced several natural hazards that greatly impacted its inhabitants and their livelihood. Mantatao was affected during the 7.2 2013 Bohol Earthquake. The earthquake created a sinking or lowering of the ground known as subsidence. During high tide, the island becomes submerged as seawaters flood the entire island. In 2021, the residents of the island were affected by Typhoon Rai or Supertyphoon Odette in the Philippines. Families were immediately evacuated to the mainland prior to the typhoon's landfall.

See also
 List of islands by population density

References

 Islands of Bohol